Juraj Valčuha (born 1976, Bratislava) is a Slovak conductor who has worked mainly in Italy and France. He is the designated conductor of the Houston Symphony Orchestra from the 2022/23 season.

Life 
Born in Bratislava, Valčuha studied composition, conducting and cimbalom at the Konzervatórium v Bratislave. He later studied conducting with Ilya Musin in Saint Petersburg, Russia, and with Janos Fürst at the Conservatoire de Paris. From 2003 to 2005, he was an assistant conductor at the Orchestre national de Montpellier and the Opéra national de Montpellier.

Valčuha first guest-conducted the RAI National Symphony Orchestra in 2005.  He became the orchestra's principal conductor in the 2009–10 season. He concluded his RAI tenure in 2016. In July 2016, the Teatro di San Carlo announced the appointment of Valčuha as its music director.  He is scheduled to stand down from the San Carlo post on 31 December 2022.   Valčuha is principal guest conductor of the Konzerthausorchester Berlin as of the 2017–18 season, following his initial guest-conducting appearance with the orchestra in the 2014–15 season, and his subsequent return guest-conducting engagement two years later. 

In the US, Valčuha first guest-conducted the Houston Symphony Orchestra in 2011.  He returned as a guest conductor with the Houston Symphony for two subsequent engagements, in April 2018 and in March 2021.  In July 2021, the Houston Symphony announced the appointment of Valčuha as its next music director, effective with the 2022–2023 season.

Valčuha makes his home in France and Houston.

References

External links 
 
 Vermont Classics agency biography of Juraj Valčuha
 Orchestra Sinfonica Nazionale della RAI English-language page on Juraj Valčuha
 Musica di RAI3, Italian-language page on Juraj Valčuha
 'Herzlich willkommen, Juraj Valcuha!'  Konzerthausorchester Berlin page on Juraj Valčuha

1976 births
Living people
Slovak conductors (music)
Male conductors (music)
Musicians from Bratislava
21st-century conductors (music)
21st-century male musicians